The Armenian Apostolic Diocese of Atrpatakan is Oriental Orthodox Christian diocese (or eparchy) of the Armenian Apostolic Church in Tabriz, Azerbaijan, Iran. It is within the ecclesiastical jurisdiction of the Catholicossate of the Great House of Cilicia, seated in Antelias. The Diocese of Atrpatakan is currently headed by Archbishop Grigor Chiftchian.

Armenian Apostolic Diocese of Atrpatakan has been based in Lilava district since relocating from Monastery of Saint Thaddeus in 1845. Its main cathedral in Tabriz is Saint Mary Church.

See also
 Armenians in Iran

References

External links

Iran
Armenian Apostolic Church in Iran
Oriental Orthodox dioceses in Asia